Henry Hayes may refer to:

People
Henry Hayes (politician), Democratic member of the Wisconsin State Assembly
Henry Browne Hayes (1762–1832), Irish-born convict
Henry Hayes (musician), American musician and record label founder

Characters
Henry Hayes (Deathlok), an incarnation of the Marvel Comics character Deathlok
Henry Hayes (Stargate), a fictional character in the Stargate universe

See also

Harry Hayes (disambiguation)
Harry Hays (disambiguation)
Henry Hays (disambiguation)